Dumfriesshire was a county constituency represented in the House of Commons of Great Britain (at Westminster) from 1708 to 1801 and in the House of Commons of the Parliament of the United Kingdom (also at Westminster) from 1801 until 2005. It was known as Dumfries from 1950.

Creation
The British parliamentary constituency was created in 1708 following the Acts of Union, 1707 and replaced the former Parliament of Scotland shire constituency of Dumfries & Annandale.

History
The constituency was virtually  unchanged until it was redistributed in 2005.  It was redistributed to Dumfriesshire, Clydesdale and Tweeddale and Dumfries and Galloway as part of a major reorganisation of Scottish constituencies. It returned one Member of Parliament (MP) by the first past the post system.

Boundaries 
From 1885 to 1918 it comprised the shire districts of the county. From 1918 all the burghs were added.

Members of Parliament

MPs 1708–1832

MPs 1832–2005 

1 Dr Hunter was elected in 1929 as a Liberal candidate, but in the split after the 1931 general election, he joined the National Liberals.

Election results

Elections in the 1830s

Elections in the 1840s

Elections in the 1850s

Douglas was appointed Comptroller of the Household, requiring a by-election.

Douglas succeeded to the peerage, becoming 8th Marquess of Queensberry and causing a by-election.

Elections in the 1860s

Waterlow was disqualified, owing to holding a government contract at the time of the election, causing a by-election.

Elections in the 1870s

Elections in the 1880s

Elections in the 1890s

Elections in the 1900s

Elections in the 1910s

General Election 1914–15:

Another General Election was required to take place before the end of 1915. The political parties had been making preparations for an election to take place and by the July 1914, the following candidates had been selected; 
Liberal: 
Unionist: William T. Shaw

Elections in the 1920s

Elections in the 1930s

Elections in the 1940s

Elections in the 1950s

Elections in the 1960s

Elections in the 1970s

Elections in the 1980s

Elections in the 1990s

Elections in the 2000s

References 

Historic parliamentary constituencies in Scotland (Westminster)
Politics of Dumfries and Galloway
Constituencies of the Parliament of the United Kingdom established in 1708
Constituencies of the Parliament of the United Kingdom disestablished in 2005